Newton Abbot F.C. was a football club based in Newton Abbot, Devon, England. They were established in 1964. In the 2005–06 season, they reached the Second Round of the FA Vase. For the 2008–09 season, they were members of the South West Peninsula League Premier Division, but were expelled from the league mid-season after failing to fulfil two fixtures. In their last season, they were managed by ex-professional footballer John Gayle.

References

Defunct football clubs in Devon
1964 establishments in England
Association football clubs established in 1964
Newton Abbot
Defunct football clubs in England
Devon County League
South West Peninsula League
Association football clubs disestablished in 2009